The 2022 Worlds Collide was the third Worlds Collide professional wrestling livestreaming event produced by WWE. While the event was held primarily for wrestlers from the promotion's NXT and NXT UK brand divisions, Worlds Collide also featured some wrestlers from WWE's main roster brands, Raw and SmackDown. It took place on Sunday, September 4, 2022, at the WWE Performance Center in Orlando, Florida, and was the first Worlds Collide to air on the livestreaming service Peacock. This was the first Worlds Collide event since 2020 and also the final event for NXT UK, which will relaunch as NXT Europe in 2023. This was also NXT's last major event in which the brand was referred to as "NXT 2.0", as nine days later, the "2.0" moniker was dropped.

Seven matches were contested at the event, including two dark matches that were later streamed on Level Up. All five matches that took place at the actual event were interbrand championship matches and three saw all but one of NXT UK's championships unified into their respective NXT championship counterparts. In the main event, NXT Champion Bron Breakker defeated NXT United Kingdom Champion Tyler Bate to unify both championships. Other prominent matches saw NXT Women's Champion Mandy Rose defeat NXT UK Women's Champion Meiko Satomura and Blair Davenport in a triple threat match to unify both women's championships, and Pretty Deadly (Elton Prince and Kit Wilson) defeated NXT Tag Team Champions The Creed Brothers (Brutus Creed and Julius Creed), NXT UK Tag Team Champions Brooks Jensen and Josh Briggs, and Gallus (Mark Coffey and Wolfgang) in a fatal four-way tag team elimination match to unify both tag team championships. The NXT UK Heritage Cup was the only championship that was not unified into an NXT championship and was the only championship between the two brands that was not defended at the event.

Production

Background 
Worlds Collide is a series of professional wrestling shows that began on January 26, 2019, when WWE held an interbrand tournament featuring wrestlers from the NXT, NXT UK, and the now-defunct 205 Live brands. After not being held in 2021 due to the COVID-19 pandemic, WWE announced on August 18, 2022, that Worlds Collide would return on September 4, 2022, and be held at the WWE Performance Center in Orlando, Florida. It was the third Worlds Collide event and primarily featured wrestlers from the NXT and NXT UK brands. The announcement also confirmed that this would be the final event for NXT UK; following the event, the brand went on hiatus and will relaunch as NXT Europe in 2023. In addition to airing on the WWE Network in international markets, it was the first Worlds Collide to air on Peacock after the American version of the WWE Network merged under Peacock in March 2021.

Storylines 

The card included matches that resulted from scripted storylines, where wrestlers portrayed heroes, villains, or less distinguishable characters in scripted events that built tension and culminated in a wrestling match or series of matches. Results was predetermined by WWE's writers on the NXT and NXT UK brands, while storylines were produced on the NXT and NXT UK television programs.

After NXT Champion Bron Breakker successfully retained his title at Heatwave, NXT United Kingdom Champion Tyler Bate appeared to confront Breakker. On the August 23 episode of NXT, both Bate and Breakker signed a contract for a championship unification match to take place at Worlds Collide.

On the August 23 episode of NXT, NXT Women's Champion Mandy Rose confronted Blair Davenport and demanded respect from her. NXT UK Women's Champion Meiko Satomura joined the confrontation, and the two champions argued who was better. The champions then agreed to a title unification match at Worlds Collide, with Davenport also being added to the match due to being the number one contender for the NXT UK Women's Championship, thus making it a triple threat title unification match.

On the August 30 episode of NXT, NXT Women's Tag Team Champions Katana Chance and Kayden Carter were confronted by Doudrop and Nikki A.S.H. from Raw, who challenged the champions for the titles at Worlds Collide, which was made official.

On the August 30 episode of NXT, during a six-person mixed tag team match pitting Fallon Henley and NXT UK Tag Team Champions Brooks Jensen and Josh Briggs against Pretty Deadly (Elton Prince and Kit Wilson) and Lash Legend, Gallus (Mark Coffey and Wolfgang) interfered in favor of Legend and Pretty Deadly and helped them to win. On the same episode, after Joe Coffey, Mark Coffey, and Wolfgang defeated Damon Kemp and NXT Tag Team Champions The Creed Brothers (Brutus Creed and Julius Creed), a brawl started between both teams, and Pretty Deadly, Briggs, and Jensen joined the fight. This led to a fatal four-way tag team elimination match being scheduled between The Creed Brothers, Briggs and Jensen, Gallus, and Pretty Deadly at Worlds Collide, which would also be a title unification match.

On the August 30 episode of NXT, NXT North American Champion Carmelo Hayes, alongside Trick Williams, discussed how no one could match Hayes' level. Ricochet from SmackDown then appeared to challenge Hayes for the title at World Collide, which was made official.

Aftermath
Tyler Bate opened the following episode of NXT to talk about his loss to Bron Breakker, only to be interrupted by Gallus (Joe Coffey, Mark Coffey, and Wolfgang). They attacked Bate and also took out security guards. Breakker made the save, and a tag team match pitting Breakker and Bate against Joe and Mark was scheduled for that episode's main event, where Breakker and Bate won. Afterwards, they were attacked by JD McDonagh, who wanted another shot at the NXT Championship after losing to Breakker at Heatwave. This set up a match between Bate and McDonagh to determine the number one contender for the title on the September 20 episode of NXT where McDonagh was victorious.

On the September 13 episode of NXT, The Creed Brothers (Brutus Creed and Julius Creed) took on Pretty Deadly (Kit Wilson and Elton Prince) in a Steel Cage match for the NXT Tag Team Championship. After interference from Damon Kemp, who handcuffed Julius to the top of the cage, Wilson and Prince pinned Brutus following a second Spilt Milk (a spinebuster/neckbreaker combination) to retain the titles. An ambulance match between Julius and Kemp would later be scheduled for Halloween Havoc, with the added stipulation that Brutus must leave NXT should Julius lose.

For costing them the NXT Women's Tag Team Championship, Toxic Attraction (Gigi Dolin and Jacy Jayne) faced Doudrop and Nikki A.S.H. on the following episode of NXT in a losing effort.

For costing him the NXT North American Championship, Trick Williams took on Ricochet on the following episode of NXT in a losing effort.

On the September 27 episode of NXT, Josh Briggs and Brooks Jensen defeated Gallus (Mark Coffey and Wolfgang) in a Pub Rules match. Following the match, Mark, Joe Coffey, and Wolfgang attacked security guards and a referee before they were arrested as NXT ended. Afterwards, it was announced that Gallus were suspended indefinitely. Gallus made their return at NXT: New Year's Evil on January 10, 2023, where they won a gauntlet match to become the number one contenders for the NXT Tag Team Championship.

The 2022 Worlds Collide would be NXT's last major event in which the brand was referred to as "NXT 2.0". At the end of the September 13 episode of NXT, a video package aired that summarized the past year of NXT's "2.0 era" and was narrated by Shawn Michaels. He talked about the brand consistently evolving with a focus on the future. Afterwards, a new gold-and-white logo was introduced, with the "NXT" logo remaining unchanged but the "2.0" moniker dropped.

Results

Fatal four-way tag team elimination match

See also
2022 in professional wrestling
List of WWE pay-per-view and WWE Network events

References

External links
 

2022 WWE Network events
2022 in Florida
Professional wrestling shows in Orlando, Florida
September 2022 events in the United States
WWE NXT
NXT UK
2022